A can wrench is a wrench made to open a telephone distribution terminal also called a telco can or demarcation point box. One end of the can wrench is a 7/16 inch hex socket used for recessed fasteners on closures, and the other end is a 3/8 inch hex socket for use on binding posts. The wrench is also referred to as a 216C tool which was the Bell System specification version. They are often insulated against electric shock. The hex socket on each end is a thin wall thickness to allow the outside diameter to be placed into the tight recessed access often found on telco cans and demarc boxes.

See also 
Socket wrench
Nut driver

Sources 

Telecommunications equipment
Wrenches